Elsner Ridge is a narrow, southwest-trending ridge, or spur,  long, located  northeast of the south end of the Homerun Range in the Admiralty Mountains of Victoria Land, Antarctica. It was mapped by the United States Geological Survey from surveys and U.S. Navy, aerial photographs, 1960–63, and was named by the Advisory Committee on Antarctic Names for Robert W. Elsner, a United States Antarctic Research Program biologist at McMurdo Station, Hut Point Peninsula, Ross Island, 1967–68, 1968–69 and 1969–70. The ridge lies situated on the Pennell Coast, a portion of Antarctica lying between Cape Williams and Cape Adare.

References 

Ridges of Victoria Land
Pennell Coast